John F. Bickford (March 12, 1843 – April 28, 1927) received the Medal of Honor in the American Civil War.

Biography
Bickford was born in Tremont, Maine, and joined the Navy from Boston, Massachusetts in January 1862. He participated in the Kearsarge's historic engagement with the CSS Alabama on June 19, 1864. Bickford later received the Medal of Honor for heroism during this battle.

After the battle, he was promoted to Acting Master's Mate in July 1864.  He was discharged from the Navy in June 1865. 

He was a companion of the Naval Order of the United States.

Bickford died on April 28, 1927. He is buried at Mount Pleasant Cemetery in Gloucester, Massachusetts.

Medal of Honor citation
Rank and organization: Captain of the Top, U.S. Navy. Born: 1843, Tremont, Maine. Accredited to: Maine. G.O. No.: 45, December 31, 1864.

Citation:

Served on board the U.S.S. Kearsarge when she destroyed the Alabama off Cherbourg, France, June 19, 1864. Acting as the first loader of the pivot gun during this bitter engagement Bickford exhibited marked coolness and good conduct and was highly recommended for his gallantry under fire by his divisional officer.

See also

List of American Civil War Medal of Honor recipients: A–F

References 

1843 births
1927 deaths
United States Navy Medal of Honor recipients
People of Maine in the American Civil War
Union Navy sailors
People from Tremont, Maine
American Civil War recipients of the Medal of Honor